Aghbolagh-e Sofla (also Romanized as Āghbolāgh-e Soflá; also known as Āgh Bolāgh-e Pā’īn, Āgh Bolāgh Pā’īn, Ak-Bola, Āq Bolāgh, Āqbolāgh, Āq Bolāgh-e Pā’īn, Āq Bolāgh-e Soflá, and Āq Bulāgh) is a village in Ozomdel-e Shomali Rural District of the Central District of Varzaqan County, East Azerbaijan province, Iran. At the 2006 National Census, its population was 1,285 in 329 households. The following census in 2011 counted 1,402 people in 395 households. The latest census in 2016 showed a population of 1,418 people in 451 households; it was the largest village in its rural district.

References 

Varzaqan County

Populated places in East Azerbaijan Province

Populated places in Varzaqan County